Algis Skačkauskas (September 17, 1955 in Prienai district – October 23, 2009 in Vilnius) was a Lithuanian painter. He studied painting at the State Art Institute of Lithuania from 1977 to 1983. After graduation, he worked as a teacher. Skačkauskas held over 20 personal exhibitions. His works are subtle, colorful, often featuring women, people working land, domestic animals.

References

1955 births
2009 deaths
Vilnius Academy of Arts alumni
20th-century Lithuanian painters